The Gohbach is a  long, right-hand tributary of the Aller in Lower Saxony, Germany.

Course 

See also 
List of rivers of Lower Saxony

References 

Rivers of Lower Saxony
Rivers of Germany